The 1969–70 season was the 71st completed season of The Football League.

Everton won their seventh league title, finishing nine points clear of Leeds United with Chelsea in third and newly promoted Derby County in fourth. Sheffield Wednesday and Sunderland were both relegated.

In the Second Division Huddersfield Town claimed the divisional title and were promoted along with runners-up Blackpool. Aston Villa endured the worst season in their history and were relegated to the Third Division for the first time, along with bottom club Preston North End, for whom it was also a first relegation to the third tier.

In the Third Division Orient won the title and were promoted along with Luton Town, who had finished third the previous season. As usual four teams were relegated, with Bournemouth & Boscombe Athletic, Southport, Barrow and Stockport County all making the drop.

In the Fourth Division Chesterfield won the title and were promoted along with Wrexham, Swansea City and Port Vale. Bradford Park Avenue lost their application for re-election and were replaced by Cambridge United.

Final league tables and results
Beginning with the season 1894–95, clubs finishing level on points were separated according to goal average (goals scored divided by goals conceded), or more properly put, goal ratio. In case one or more teams had the same goal difference, this system favoured those teams who had scored fewer goals. The goal average system was eventually scrapped beginning with the 1976–77 season.

Since the Fourth Division was established in the 1958–59 season, the bottom four teams of that division have been required to apply for re-election.

First Division

Results

Maps

Top scorers
Goalscorers are listed order of total goals, then according to the number of league goals, then of FA cup goals, then of League Cup goals. A dash means the team of the player in question did not participate in European competitions.

The goals listed below in the European fields stem from the following competitions:
Leeds United participated in the 1969–70 European Cup.
Manchester City participated in the 1969–70 European Cup Winners' Cup.
 Arsenal, Liverpool, Newcastle United and Southampton participated in 1969–70 Inter-Cities Fairs Cup

Second Division

Results

Maps

Top scorers
Goalscorers are listed order of total goals, then according to the number of league goals, then of FA cup goals, then of League Cup goals. A dash means the team of the player in question did not participate in European competitions.

Third Division

Results

Maps

Top scorers
Goalscorers are listed order of total goals, then according to the number of league goals, then of FA cup goals, then of League Cup goals. A dash means the team of the player in question did not participate in European competitions.

Fourth Division

Results

Maps

Top scorers
Goalscorers are listed order of total goals, then according to the number of league goals, then of FA cup goals, then of League Cup goals. A dash means the team of the player in question did not participate in European competitions.

See also
 1969-70 in English football

Notes

References 

 Ian Laschke: Rothmans Book of Football League Records 1888–89 to 1978–79. Macdonald and Jane’s, London & Sydney, 1980.

External links
 Season 1969-70 complete complete lineups, tables and squads at Historical Football Lineups

 
English Football League seasons